Dana Tyler (born November 24, 1958) is a news anchor and reporter at WCBS-TV in New York City, where she anchors the station's 6 PM newscast. In addition, Tyler hosts Eye on New York, a half-hour weekly community affairs program for WCBS, as well as several annual local specials: CBS 2 at Tonys, CBS 2 at the Met and Tunnel to Towers Run. Tyler first joined WCBS as a weekend anchor and a reporter on July 16, 1990.

Early life and education
Tyler was born in Fort Lauderdale, Florida and grew up in Worthington, Ohio, a suburb of Columbus. Her father, Waldo H. Tyler, was a pharmacist in Columbus. In 1966, the elder Tyler generated notoriety for ending the sale of cigarettes in his store. Her great-great-grandfather was James Seneca Tyler, the first black clerk of the Ohio House of Representatives. Her great-grandfather was Ralph Waldo Tyler, a society editor and political correspondent at The Columbus Dispatch and the first accredited African-American war correspondent to report on African-American soldiers stationed overseas during World War I.

Tyler was a member of the local Girl Scout troop.  She first appeared on television at age of 8, appearing as a “clean plater” on a local show called Lucy’s Toy Shop where she was asked to eat a plateful of spinach and sing a jingle to a tree. She later attended Worthington High School and was a cheerleader.

Career 
Tyler began her journalism career as an intern at WBNS-TV Channel 10 in Columbus and was eventually promoted to role of reporter in 1981. In 1987, the station acquired its first satellite truck and Tyler, along with co-host Dave Kaylor, launched a statewide show called Heart of Ohio. Tyler later won an Emmy for her work on the show and, by 1986, became a co-anchor of the station's evening newscasts. Tyler then moved to New York, and to WCBS-TV in June 1990 as weekend anchor and reporter. Along with Reggie Harris, she was part of the first African-American team in the New York market to anchor a newscast. She quickly moved up to the 5:00 p.m. and 11:00 p.m. newscasts in 1993. At WCBS-TV, Tyler has worked alongside some of the better-known television news anchors in New York City including Jim Jensen, Brian Williams, Ernie Anastos, John Johnson, Michele Marsh, Ira Joe Fisher and Roz Abrams. She also worked with Stephen Clark, Don Dahler, and Chris Wragge. Tyler remained in her post through a major staff reduction in November 1996 when several of the station's on-air personalities, including Marsh, Johnson, and Harris, were fired.

Tyler returned as the anchor on WCBS's 11 p.m. newscast, in addition to her 6 p.m. duties, both alongside Jim Rosenfield, on April 17, 2006 as part of a shakeup in anchors where no one stayed in their old capacity. She replaced veteran WABC-TV anchor Roz Abrams, who had replaced her a few years prior (Abrams moved to the noon and 5pm newscasts, but is now no longer with the station) only to be replaced again in 2007 by Kristine Johnson. In July 2020, Tyler celebrated 30 years at WCBS-TV.

Personal life 
Tyler met drummer Phil Collins during a press junket for the Broadway musical Tarzan. She had a relationship with Collins from 2006 until 2015.

She lives in Stamford, Connecticut and is a recreational golfer with a handicap in the high 20's.

Awards and honors 
Tyler received The New York Association of Black Journalists Lifetime Achievement Award in 2014. She holds an honorary Doctor of Letters degree from St. John's University and received the Alumni Award for Distinguished Service from Boston University. Tyler received two Emmy Awards in 2003 for coverage of a July 2003 shooting at New York's City Hall and for WCBS-TV's reporting on the August 2003 blackout.

Other media appearances
In 2000, Tyler guest starred as herself on Everybody Loves Raymond in the episode "Robert's Rodeo," promoting an upcoming news story with video of a bull chasing a police officer – that officer being Robert Barone.

Tyler also had a cameo in the Woody Allen film Small Time Crooks as a television reporter, which also came out in 2000.

References

External links
WCBS-TV New York Bio

1958 births
Boston University School of Management alumni
Living people
Television anchors from New York City
New York (state) television reporters
People from Worthington, Ohio
Journalists from Ohio